Khandkhel or Khand Khil is a town in the Said Karam District of Paktia Province, Afghanistan. It is located 25 km to the northeast of Gardez, the capital of Paktia, and is 40 km to the southwest of Aryob.

Climate
Khandkhel features a humid continental climate (Dfb) under the Köppen climate classification. It has warm summers and cold, snowy winters.

See also
 Paktia Province

References

Populated places in Paktia Province